The kaskara is a type of traditional sword, which is characteristic of Sudan, Chad, and Eritrea. The blade of the kaskara was usually about a yard long, double edged and with a spatulate tip. While most surviving examples are from the 19th century, the type is believed to have originated around the early 14th century, and may represent a localized survival of the straight, double-edged medieval Arab sword. The kaskara was worn horizontally across the back or between the upper arm and thorax. According to British Museum curator Christopher Spring, "in the central and eastern Sudan, from Chad through Darfur and across to the Red Sea province, the straight, double-edged swords known as kaskara were an essential possession of most men."

References

External links 
Photograph of a Kaskar
https://www.theknohlcollection.com/portfolio/detail/west-african-mandinka-dress-sword/
https://www.ultimateknivesandgear.com/resources/history/item/484-kaskara
http://www.arms2armor.com/Swords/kaskara.htm

African swords
Blade weapons
Sudanese culture